The Purity of the Turf is a studio album led by American jazz pianist Ethan Iverson. The album was recorded in 2016 and released by the Criss Cross Jazz label on September 16, 2016.

Reception

The Guardian'''s John Fordham called it "An album of delightfully rugged character, as might be expected from the lineup". DownBeat reviewer Bob Doerschuk said "all three musicians conspire to create a landmark session, one that targets both the visceral pleasures of swing and more cerebral levels of appreciation". In his article for JazzTimes, Michael J. West wrote, "the fun of listening to The Purity of the Turf'' is in the anticipation of Iverson throwing such wrenches into the works ... The album’s repertoire of standards and how he reorients them toward his own twisty concept comprise its considerable pleasure".

Track listing
 "The Purity of the Turf" (Ethan Iverson) – 4:31
 "Song for My Father" (Horace Silver) – 5:19
 "Darn That Dream" (Jimmy Van Heusen, Eddie DeLange) – 4:43
 "Along Came Betty" (Benny Golson) – 5:45
 "Graduation Day" (Iverson) – 3:33
 "Confirmation" (Charlie Parker) – 6:14
 "Kush" (Nasheet Waits) – 5:35
 "Sent for You Yesterday" (Count Basie, Eddie Durham) – 4:55
 "Strange Serenade" (Andrew Hill) – 4:23
 "Little Waltz" (Ron Carter) – 5:01
 "Einbahnstrasse" (Carter) – 5:10
 "So Hard It Hurts" (Annette Peacock) – 3:18

Personnel
Ethan Iverson − piano
Ron Carter − bass
Nasheet Waits - drums

References

Ethan Iverson albums
2016 albums
Criss Cross Jazz albums